Eupithecia conjunctiva is a moth in the  family Geometridae. It is found in Afghanistan, northern Pakistan, Jammu and Kashmir and northern India (Punjab, Sikkim), and Nepal. It is found at altitudes between 1,100 and 3,000 meters.

References

Moths described in 1895
conjunctiva
Moths of Asia